Akmaral Zykayeva (Aqmaral Ūlanqyzy Zyqaeva; born 21 December 1985), better known by the stage name Mergen, is a Kazakh artist, singer, songwriter, violinist, a sound producer, sound engineer, composer, arranger.

Biography

Musical career
Born and raised in Almaty, she graduated from Kazakh National Conservatory of Music in 2008 and Musicians Institute, LA, USA in 2010. She has released and produced independently three studio albums and an EP under different eponyms. As a classically trained violinist Akmaral has worked in the National Youth Symphony and performed in Konzerthaus Berlin, London's Barbican and other concert halls around Europe.

At 16 she started writing her first poems under alias Mergen which she then records and self-produces into songs. A debut album 13 was released in 2009. Akmaral graduated from the MI with the Outstanding Project Award beating other 120 artists. In 2011 she released the second album AYAN.

In 2012 Akmaral worked in cinema post production at the Kazakhfilm Studios as sound director, sound engineer, foley artist and ADR editor.

In 2012–2013 she became head of Bilim Media Group Recording Studios working on her third album entitled Qazaq Lounge as the producer engrossing more than 40 professionals including other producers, vocalists and musicians. Qazaq Lounge is the mix of ethnic, instrumental, electronic, jazz and classic music.

In 2015 she recorded an EP under her real name in an orchestral cinematic style playing most violin parts herself.

She took part in various educational projects inspiring younger artists to create unique content.

The artist took part in producing sounds for London Fashion Week, Red Cross and Crescent, and other commissionary projects.

That same year she started writing new material for the next solo album.

Discography
13 (2009)
Ayan (2011)
Qazaq Lounge (2013)
EP - instrumental triptych for violin - Mise En Scene (2015)

References 

21st-century Kazakhstani women singers
1985 births
Living people
Musicians Institute alumni